The Associated Public Schools of Victoria (APS) are a group of eleven independent schools in Victoria, Australia, similar to the Athletic Association of the Great Public Schools of New South Wales in New South Wales and the Public Schools Association in Western Australia. The descriptor 'Public School' references the historical usage of the term and the model of the British public school.

The first meet of Public Schools Sports was held at the Melbourne Cricket Ground on 30 November 1870 with Melbourne Grammar School, Scotch College and Wesley College competing and winning that order.  The Association was established in 1908 so that students of the member schools may compete against each other on the sporting fields, the original competition sports were Australian Rules Football, Athletics, Rowing and Cricket. Students now compete in a variety of sports, which are split into three seasons, Summer, Winter and Spring. Students in Year 7 and above compete on Saturdays and students in primary year levels compete on Wednesday afternoons. Major annual competitions include the APS Head of the River Rowing Regattas, the APS Combined Swimming & Diving Championships and the APS Combined Athletics Championships.

In March 2005, the APS member schools formed a set of guidelines regarding the awarding of sporting scholarships to students, following criticism of recruiting practices employed by some schools. The headquarters of the APS is known as APS House and is located on Church Street in Hawthorn, Victoria.

Schools

Current member schools

Sports

Boys
 Athletics
 Australian Rules Football
 Stand Up Paddle Boarding
 Badminton
 Basketball
 Cricket
 Cross Country
 Diving (since 2015)
 Futsal
 European Handball
 Gymnastics
 Hockey
 Rowing
 Rugby (VSRU runs this competition)
 Sailing
 Soccer
 Squash
 Swimming & Diving (combined with Diving from 1998 to 2015)
 Table Tennis
 Tennis
 Volleyball
 Water Polo 

Girls
 Athletics
 Australian Rules Football (since 2019)
 Badminton
 Basketball
 Cross Country
 Diving (since 2015)
 Gymnastics
 Hockey
 Netball
 Rowing
 Soccer
 Softball
 Swimming & Diving (combined with Diving from 1998 to 2015)
 Tennis
 Touch Football (since 2017)
 Volleyball
 Water Polo

Combined Sports
Students from the Association's member schools participate in a number of Combined Sports (Championship Carnivals) during the year including Swimming, Diving, Rowing and Athletics.

The APS Regatta (Heads of the River)

The Victorian Head of the River race is contested between the 11 APS schools, the race is usually the last race of the official APS rowing season and has recently been rowed on Lake Nagambie which is a full buoyed international standard course allowing six boat finals. Girls from the APS also participate in the Head of the Schoolgirls regatta, where they compete with schools from the Girls Sport Victoria (GSV) group.

See also
 List of schools in Victoria, Australia

References

External links

 
Australian school sports associations
Organisations based in Melbourne
1908 establishments in Australia
Organizations established in 1908